The 1976 Colgate International was a women's tennis tournament played on outdoor grass courts at Devonshire Park in Eastbourne in the United Kingdom. The event was part of the 1976 WTA Tour. It was the third edition of the tournament and was held from 14 June through 20 June 1976. First-seeded Chris Evert won the singles title and earn £9,000 first-prize money.

Finals

Singles
 Chris Evert defeated  Virginia Wade 8–6, 6–3
It was Evert's 7th singles title of the year and the 62nd of her career.

Doubles
 Chris Evert /  Martina Navratilova led  Olga Morozova /  Virginia Wade 6–4, 1–1 divided due to rain

Prize money

References

External links
 Women's Tennis Association (WTA) tournament details

Colgate International
Eastbourne International
Colgate International
Colgate International
1976 in English women's sport